Sehra Main Safar is a Pakistani romantic drama serial premiered on Hum TV on 18 December 2015. It is produced by Momina Duraid under MD Productions and written by Sarwat Nazir.

Synopsis

Episode 1 
Sehra Main Safar is the story of a girl, Iqra (Zarnish Khan), who likes being in a house and doing household chores. She has never thought of doing a job and never wants to. Her father, Farooq is a very genius man and when he retires, the indication is that the responsibility of maintaining the house will land on Iqra. Her father is the uncle of Ayaz (Ali Kazmi), who likes Iqra. Watch the cute story of Iqra and Ayaz unfold.

Episode 2 
Ayaz says to his mother for his love and marriage to Iqra. His mother says positive. In other side, Shagufta comes into Iqra's home for her marriage to her brother. Iqra first says negative. Ayaz calls Iqra as his mother tells him about Iqra's marriage to her neighbour. Iqra says that it is her parents' wish, and as they wish, she will do. Fauzia comes into Iqra's home to tell them about the marriage of Iqra and Ayaz. Her father first refuses for this proposal but then accepts. Her father makes money online and puts his money in the bank. Thieves steal the money which results in  Farooq's heart attack and thus they go to hospital.

Episode 3 
Ayaz helps Farooq in hospital. Farooq recovers but still has a stroke. Farooq needs someone to push his leg or arm because he has previously suffered a heart attack. Aliya does this. Farooq expresses the wish that Iqra must be married to his nephew Ayaz. Aliya tells this to Iqra and she agrees because it's her parents' wish. Fouzia also tells Ayaz about his marriage to Iqra but he refuses as she has already a proposal from Shagufta's brother.

Episode 4 
The episode starts with Fauzia expressing the wish to visit Iqra's home and Iqra making chicken and potato. Aliya denies her that it will be a fast food for her (Iqra)'s paternal aunt. Fauzia calls Farooq, who is already surviving a stroke, and tells him that Iqra must get a job in order to marry Ayaz. Farooq weeps but accepts. Aliya says about who called him? He says that Fauzia and expresses his wish that Iqra must do a job in order to marry Ayaz. Aliya asks what will she do? He says that his daughter will do much to achieve success. Aliya goes to Farooq who has not slept yet. Iqra comes and says that she will do much to achieve success. Farooq says that he knows that she will do much. Ayaz eats dinner with his mother. Her mother says him that his refusing amused her. He said that she wants to marry a rich man and he is not a rich man. Shagufta calls Aliya instead of Iqra. Aliya tells Iqra that she wants Iqra to be in her home. Iqra goes to Shagufta's home, and Shagufta lies on the bed. Iqra asks about her condition, and she says she is fine. Iqra tells her about her job and says that she will not marry for a while. Aasma annoys her mother that she wants 2,000 rupees for her farewell party. She says that she must refuse because of her father's condition. Iqra tells her that it is not good as her father is ill. She says that she is lucky as she is only in the home and never goes anywhere. Iqra gives her 600 rupees but she refuses and says this is very short money and it's better to not go anywhere. At night, Iqra calls Aasma that she will do much to achieve success. Aasma says that she will give tuition to others in order to become rich. Iqra says it's a great plan. She goes office tomorrow after greeting her father.

Episode 5 
The episode starts with Iqra who is in the office and meets Sonia. Iqra forgot to take lunch with her and eats Sonia's lunch with her permission. Aliya says that without Iqra this home is silent and also forgot to make and eat a lunch because she thought that Iqra is there because she always made lunch for all. Iqra comes to home, greets all and says that today was successful. The next day, Aliya gives her lunch and she goes in a van. A man touches her but she tries to give distance to him. He goes away. She goes to the office. This time a man says that this is not a rule of doing office work. Iqra becomes sad for a long time. Sonia tries to console her but she can't. There she meets with Asif and his girlfriend. Asif always greets Iqra on a new day. When she returns, there she waits for the van but it doesn't come. A same man comes to take her but she refuses. Ayaz comes and takes her to her home. Ayaz talks Iqra about her marriage but she says that she has a job and she will work and she will not marry until her father recovers. She goes home. Aliya asks about why she is late she says that Ayaz gone today to take off her.

Episode 6 
The episode starts with Aliya saying to Iqra that why she had come with Ayaz in bike. Iqra said her mother to forgive her, Aliya accepted. Ayaz comes to home bit his mother ignored to talk with him. He said her to forgive him as she is angry on his thing which he told her in morning. Fouzia forgiven. Aliya comes and tells Farooq all things Iqra done. Farooq says that Iqra is a mature girl and she will understand. Aasma comes and says that "why are you feeling irritated" She says to Iqra. And she replies that Ayaz today dropped you? Iqra said yes, she said that's good. Iqra said her that she (Iqra) is tired and make her clothes iron. Nabeel said to Iqra that why she don't given time to him and given to Ayaz. Nabeel says that this cousin's relation is good that whenever she make others her cousin. Shazia says that "why you are taking this thing on your heart, there work is to talk to women". Sir called Iqra and said that "Nabeel doesn't does good thing that's why ignore him". And says that "She (Iqra) is very good worker and says that she work little hard." Iqra becomes happy. Iqra waits for Bus, Ayaz comes and says that he drop her in to home. Iqra ignored and said that she will not go with him. Ayaz asks reason, she says that Bus has come, she will go. Ayaz said to Fouzia that he wants to marry Iqra. Fouzia says "Are you mad? You denied to marry and now you accepted". Fouzia says that you don't do fasting, i will do. Show took 1-Month leap. Shazia says Iqra to go with her to do shopping. She bought many things and clothes. Aliya opens door and says that where were you? Iqra says that why you start asking things. Iqra goes to her father and says that she has bought many things. Aliya says that why she done this? She bought a jacket for her father. She gives 27,000 to her mother as her salary. Aliya says that she will use this money good. Iqra says to Farooq that Do you do exercise. Farooq says that yes. Aasma comes and says that what she bought for her (Aasma). She says nothing but she will give 500 rupees. Aliya says that why she gone to shopping. She says that it was Shazia's wish. Aliya says that why she gave Aasma 500 rupees. Aasma, in laugh voice, snatched that. Aliya calculates bill and says to Farooq that Iqra didn't spend money because how food and other things be done. Aliya and Farooq say that Iqra is good girl. Asif says to sir that payment has been done. Sir calls Iqra, says her that she is well worker and she can be a good woman. Sir says that payment has been increased by 5000 of your monthly salary. Shazia says that why she uses her money in home, she says it will be good for her parents. Fouzia goes to Farooq's home. Aliya comes in the room and says him that she will use this money on right things. Farooq says that medicines also. She says that she willm Iqra prepares for College. Aliya says Iqra many things to buy. Iqra comes with Shazia and says her to buy shoes. She ignored to buy. She buys. Fouzia comes to Farooq's home and says that she has come to marry Ayaz to Iqra. He ignores. She says that not fastly we will marry but many years later. Farooq accepts but Aliya upsets. Farooq says that it is my order that now Iqra will now only marry with Ayaz. Iqra calls Aliya qnd says that she has bought as you said as well as her shoe. She said that it is more old and becomes angry. Iqra also becomes angry.

Episode 7 
The episode starts with Iqra thinking of works which she done before office (i.e. greeting Farooq, Farooq says that Iqra will do anything). Aasma calls her and says her to give her dress. Iqra says Aasma to go out for 1 minute. Aasma comes to Aliya, says her that her aapi has done bad deed with her. Aliya says she comes from office tha's why she has a tension, so you don't say me. Iqra sleeps. Aliya comes and kisses her and puts blanket on her. Farooq says what happened? Aliya said "I think Iqra has tension today, she has done bad deed." And says that "She has bought Shoes that's why i gave her that this's not good." Farooq says "She is an office worker, she will biy anything on het choice, you don't say her anything." Fouzia maintains hairs. Ayaz comes and says that are you fine? He gives her water. Fouzia says that Iqra will accept this marriage and Farooq and Aliya has also. You don't do anything. Aliya calls Iqra but Iqra is at office. She says that what will happen, she will ne tired. Iqra comes and says Kazmi Iqra says Shazia that the shoes which we bought yesterday were not liked by Aliya. Shazia says that not problem and says that why you told that you have got bonus of 5,000. Iqra says that her brain is bad. Shazia says her to ready for her bonus. Iqra says her that it's good. Any other woman says her that another man has got job instead of Nabeel. Iqra comes office and greets counter. Shehreyar comes and likes Iqra. After his coming, all girls see Shehreyar and say them handsome. Nida says peon that what his name. Peon said "Shehreyar Ahmed". Sir called Shehreyar and said that he always do good works. He is the son of a factory manager and works for his own benefit. Nida says Kareem (Peon) to ask him what they (Shehreyar and Sir) are talking. He said all things. She said to Iqra if she liked him but Iqra refused. Sir called Iqra and said him that she is a good worker and bonus has given to your account. Sir called Shehreyar, said him that Iqra is a good worker, you also should bem Iqra comes to counter and says him to have bonus. Iqra became happy as she took. Iqra says that she will give this money to her guardians. Iqra says that she will don't tell lie she will give this to her guardian. Shazia says that there is also right of your to spend in various conditions. Iqra refused. Iqra comes to home, gives 42,000 to Aliya and says she to renovate home. Farooq said that she must save for herself. Iqra refused to do. Aasma had to buy 2 suits. Aliya refused but Aliya accepted. Iqra works in computer. Shehreyar says Iqra that if she can e-mail. Iqra refused. Shehreyar says that he has listened that Iqra will do. Iqra finally accepted. Nida says Iqra and says what Shehreyar said. She said it was work of e-mail. Nida said Shehreyar and gave him e-mail attachment and said to always say her to give attachment. Iqra comes home and says that why she broke up some cups. She said why is it happening and she said that she will not take tea and said that to broke up remaining cups. Aliya says Farooq that Iqra was a good woman and now she had said that don't waste money on unuseful works. Iqra called Aliya and said that she is shameful for her deed. She said that if she will not forgive, she will not be able to sleep. Aasma wakes up and Shagufta comes and says that she had come after long days. She says that she had come today to take proposal of Aasma because her brother don't like office women.

Episode 9 
The episode starts with Shazia telling Iqra that Shehreyar is interested in her, and she should be a little nicer to him. After work it starts raining heavily while Iqra waits for the bus. Shehreyar asks Iqra to let him drive her home. Iqra hesitates, but Shehreyar insists. In the car, Shehreyar says to Iqra "You look good when you smile, " to which she responds "In our society when a girl smiles, people take the wrong impression, therefore it is better not to smile. I think we should go home now, the rain has also settled down a bit."
At home, Aliya asks why Iqra came so late. When Iqra tells her, Aliya is furious, and asks her when she forbid her to come home with Ayaz on his bike, why she thought it was appropriate to come home with her male colleague. Iqra becomes angry at this and says some harsh words to her mother.
Fouzia come and said  Ayaz said Iqra how is she? she said fine. Ayaz said you are looking sad. Are you not happy with Aasma's marriage. She said no. Ayaz talked, Iqra said Had you any work, if you have to meet Aasma, she is outside. Ayaz gone outside but with seeing Iqra. Ayaz brought tea for Fouzia. Ayaz said how is tea? she said fine like every day. Ayaz asked Had you meet Iqra? she said no. He said i meet. He added that "She was looking sad and this is not good that Aasma married instead of Iqra". Fouzia said that she also said this to Farooq but he said that this depended on the condition. Aasma wake up and was making up hairs. Iqra came, she said you are looking good. Iqra said that she is going tell this to Aliya. Aliya came and said where is Iqra? she said that she has gone. Iqra was waiting for bus. Shehreyar came and said her that to come in his car. They talked. Shehreyar and Iqra reached at office. Nida saw her and said to Shazia that when she got rich man, she talked and done many things for her. Farooq called Aliya and said that he has got money of the month! and given the money to Aliya. He also said that Iqra helped them in the difficulty. Aliya said that with being mother, i didn't explain my daughter because she does what she wants. Iqra was happy and given reports. Shazia said that Nida said that you came with Shehreyar today. Iqra said that today bus didn't come that's why i do so. Asma's marriage was taking place. Ayaz said her that whom is she waiting? Ayaz talked with Iqra. Iqra stopped the conversation to go with Shehreyar. Ayaz also seen her and gone and also seeing. Shehreyar and Iqra were talking. Iqra decided to meet Shehreyar with Farooq. Fouzia also saw her in angry face. Fouzia and Ayaz were also talking about Shehreyar as this is 1st time done in their family that Iqra has made friendship with man whom she don't know. She says that she will take Marriage date from Farooq. Iqra goes in office this time again with Shehreyar. Akbar also saw them talking each other. Iqra visited to Akbar's staff room for main work. There was another man whom she given assignment. The other man thought that Iqra is not like that. Iqra also listened what they said. Iqra was thinking of a better solution. Nida and Shazia gone to room with the permission of Iqra. Shehreyar said Iqra to take off him but she refused as all are making fun of this thing as love. Shehreyar said that what happened, i can't see you in condition. Iqra lied that she has headache. Shehreyar said if you will not go, i will also not. Iqra said to go with Shehreyar for lunch to Shehreyar. Asma said that All my in-laws care of me to Aliya. She said that she misses her to Aliya. Aliya said that she is not as she was before. They talked more. Iqra came home, she saw a car, she said whose car is this, he said it is of Aasma. She came home, greeted all. Aasma said that "i miss you more than others" Iqra became jealous and said that why do you marry him? you should be with us? she said it was as Farooq said. She said them to go out she has to sleep but was she still angry.⋅···

Cast 
 Zarnish Khan as Iqra
 Ali Kazmi as Ayaz
 Emmad Irfani as Sheheryar
 Anoushey Ashraf as Annie
 Lubna Aslam as Fouzia
 Shehryar Zaidi as Farooq 
 Humaira Zaheer as Aliya
 Aiman Khan as Anaya
 Erum Azam as Asma
 Esha Noor as Ayesha
 Afraz Rasool as Maamul
 Wajid Kazi
 Hania Naqvi
 Shaman Bashir

Reception
The drama series became popular soon after it went on-air. It made Hum TV the slot leader on Fridays at the 9pm slot. Just in its first episode, in the U.K., Sehra Main Safar drew in 49,400 viewers at 9pm. This rating further increased and Sehra Main Safar was most watched on Hum Europe in the U.K. as its second episode had a rating of 62,900 viewers. Rising even more, the third episode of Sehra Main Safar in the U.K. registered 69,300 viewers on New Year's Day. The drama was most watched on Hum Europe again on both 8 January 2016 and 15 January 2016. On its 4th episode (8 Jan), SMS attracted 55,500 viewers but on its 5th episode (15 Jan), in the U.K., Sehra Main Safar topped the ratings with its highest score of 78,700 viewers. The repeat of the 5th episode which aired on 22 Jan in UK, also pulled in 78,100 viewers. The twelfth episode aired on 11 March 2016, in U.K., and garnered the most ratings for the show and the channel on the night with 98,800 viewers. In Pakistan it also received much positive feedback. Its 7th episode gained 3.0 TRPs, the 11th episode had 3.2 TRPs and the 15th had 2.5 TRPs.

Original soundtrack 

The song of Sehra Main Safar is its original soundtrack. It is produced by Momina Duraid in label of MD Productions and written by Sarwat Nazir, a fiction writer.

References

External links 
 Official website

Hum TV original programming
Pakistani drama television series
2015 Pakistani television series debuts
2016 Pakistani television series endings